Sir Stephen Paul Stewart (born 9 October 1953) was a Justice of the High Court of Justice of England and Wales.

Career
Stewart was called to the bar at Middle Temple, where he was a Harmsworth major exhibitioner and scholar, in 1975. He was appointed an Assistant Recorder in 1995 and a Recorder in 1999. He was a deputy judge of the Technology and Construction Court from 2000 to 2003. He was appointed a senior circuit judge (Northern Circuit) in 2003. On 7 May 2013, Stewart was appointed a High Court judge, assigned to the Queen's Bench Division, and received the customary knighthood in the 2013 Special Honours.

References

1953 births
Living people
Alumni of St Peter's College, Oxford
Members of the Middle Temple
20th-century English judges
Queen's Bench Division judges
Knights Bachelor
Circuit judges (England and Wales)
21st-century English judges